The FMK-5 is a circular Argentinian minimum metal anti-tank blast mine. Like the FMK-3 mine it uses a FMK-1 anti-personnel mine as a trigger. The FMK-1 is fitted with a stiff cap to increase its activation pressure to 300 kg. Without the cap, the mine would be triggered by a load of less than 50 kg.

Specifications
 Diameter: 254 mm
 Height: 88 mm
 Weight: 6.13 kg
 Explosive content: 5 kg of TNT
 Operating pressure: 300 kg

References
 Jane's Mines and Mine Clearance 2005-2006

Anti-tank mines
Land mines of Argentina
Fabricaciones Militares